Vallée de l'Ahzar is a wadi in West Africa. For most of its course, the wadi forms part of the international boundary between Mali and Niger. It separates Mali's Ménaka Region from the Tahoua and Tillabéri Regions of Niger.

References

Rivers of Mali
Rivers of Niger
International rivers of Africa
Wadis
Mali–Niger border
Ménaka Region
Tahoua Region
Tillabéri Region